Gliese 176 is a red dwarf in the constellation of Taurus. Based upon parallax measurements from the Hipparcos mission, it is located approximately 30 light-years away. The star is orbited by a Super-Earth.

Planetary system
A planetary companion to Gliese 176 was announced in 2008. Radial velocity observations with the Hobby-Eberly Telescope (HET) showed a 10.24-day periodicity, which was interpreted as being caused by a planet. With a semi-amplitude of 11.6 m/s, its minimum mass equated to 24.5 Earth masses, or approximately 1.4 Neptune masses.

Observations with the HARPS spectrograph could not confirm the 10.24-day variation. Instead, two other periodicities were detected at 8.78 and 40.0 days, with amplitudes below the HET observational errors. The 40-day variation coincides with the rotational period of the star and is therefore caused by activity, but the shorter-period variation is not explained by activity and is therefore caused by a planet. Its semi-amplitude of 4.1 m/s corresponds to a minimum mass of 8.4 Earth masses, making the planet a Super-Earth.

In an independent study, observations with Keck-HIRES also failed to confirm the 10.24-day signal. An 8.77-day periodicity - corresponding to the planet announced by the HARPS team - was detected to intermediate significance, though it was not deemed significant enough to claim a planetary cause with their data alone.

See also
 List of extrasolar planets
 Gliese 674

References

BD+18 683
285968
021932
0176
M-type main-sequence stars
Planetary systems with one confirmed planet
Taurus (constellation)
J04425581+1857285
TIC objects